or standard Ladin is the standard written constructed language (Dachsprache) based on the similarities of the five main dialect-groups of Ladin.  It is the desired outcome of the project called SPELL ( – "service for the planning and preparation of the Ladin language") under the initiative of The Union Generala di Ladins dles Dolomites (project owner) and the Ladin cultural institutes Micurà de Rü, Majon di Fascegn and Istitut Pedagogich Ladin to create a unified standard written language.

History 
The contract to work on the project was given in 1988 by representatives from the Dolomite Ladins to the Zurich Professor Heinrich Schmid, who had previously designed the Dachsprache Rumantsch Grischun written language. Schmid accepted this challenge and in 1998 he published for standard Ladin its Guidelines for the Development of a Common Written Language of the Dolomite Ladins, in which the outlines for the new written language were presented.  All written forms of Ladin Dolomitan words are carried over from spoken forms already existing in the spoken dialects based on a principle of the lowest common denominator in language formation. Its popularity within the Ladin community varies by valley and dialect spoken.

Goals and current status 
The goal of Ladin Dolomitan is not to replace or displace the existing Ladin languages of the different valleys but rather to serve as a Dachsprache and standard language for communication between speakers of the different dialects. This may also reduce the administrative burden of authorities and organization, which are not only linked to a single valley. For example, it allows for the administration of the South Tyrol to use a single Ladin language form for the communities in Val Gardena and Val Badia. Today, some institutions, such as the Union Generela di Ladins dles Dolomites (the umbrella organization of the Sella Ladin), the Comunanza Ladina de Bulsan, and the Free University of Bozen-Bolzano use Ladin Dolomitan as the default language used in their publications.

Phonology

Morphology

Articles 

Example:  'the father',  'a father',  'the house',  'a house'

Plurals 
Ladin dolomitan alike other West Romance languages a sigmatic plural.

 In general, words ending in a consonant use -es:  –  –  – ;
 words ending in -a or -e use -es:  – ;
 words ending in -n or in a stressed vowel (-é, -ù etc.) use -s:  – ;
 words ending in -f use -ves:  – ; and
 words ending in -sc use the plural suffix -jes:  – .
Additionally, there are some irregular forms:  –  etc.

Comparative 
The comparative is formed using  ('more') + adjective:  ('old') –  ('older'). Superlatives are formed using a comparative preceded by the corresponding article:  ('the oldest').
There is a negative comparative, too, using  ('few'): } ('the least oldest' = 'the youngest').

Pronouns 

The second person plural beginning in a majuscule  is used as a polite form in singular too.

Ladin is not a pro-drop language, the unstressed personal pronoun is never omitted (e.g.:  'it rains'). There is an unpersonal pronoun in singular . The stressed pronouns are used to stress the agent. Ladin uses special enclitic pronouns for questions:

Verbal Morphology 
Conjungation of regular verbs on -é (lat. -are) in present tense:

Orthography 
The proposed orthographic conventions largely follow the Italian orthography. It is compatible with the unified orthography for the ladin dialects.

References 

Ladin Dolomitan
Standard languages